This is a list of Nepalese List A cricketers. List A cricket matches are those between international teams or the highest standard of domestic teams. Matches played in the tournament of World Cricket League division 2 and above also qualify as List A. This list is not limited to those who have played List A cricket for Nepal and may include Nepalese players who played their List A cricket elsewhere means in Nepal national team, or any other domestic matches which has list a status. Nepal got honored with an ODI status on 15 March 2018 after the win over Papua New Guinea in the playoff game of The ICC world cup qualifier-2018. Netherlands beat Hong Kong in the next game ensured that Nepal will secure an ODI along with T20I status till 2022 and a road to ICC Intercontinental Cup as well as ICC World Cricket League Championship which will be continued for 4 years till 2022.

The list A players of Nepal are listed alphabetically by their last name.

Key

Players 

Statistics are correct as of Nepal's most recent List A match, against Netherlands 17 March 2018.

See also 

 Nepal national cricket team
 List A cricket
 List of Nepal Twenty20 International cricketers
 List of Nepalese First-class cricketers
 List of Nepalese Twenty20 cricketers

External links 

 Cricket Archive
 Nepalese players in the 2014 World Cup Qualifier
 Nepalese players in the 2015 ICC World Cricket League Division Two

References 

Lists of Nepalese cricketers